The Norwegian National Academy of Ballet was established in 1979 as a three-year education in ballet. The school was given collegiate status in 1982.

In 1996 the National Academy of Ballet became part of Oslo National Academy of the Arts (Kunsthøgskolen i Oslo, KHiO).

The Norwegian National Academy of Ballet  consists of 5 different dance programmes:

BA Modern Dance and Contemporary Dance

Three-year course (180 credits)

The programme is intended to train dancers for established Norwegian and foreign ballet companies, institutional theatres, the free dance environment, advertising, reviews, film and TV – and for various initiatives targeted at schools and the business community. A further aim is for students to learn to create their own workplace.

Dance techniques and on-stage communication make up the main part of the course. Students also create their own works through the study of choreography. There are also classes in musical subjects, nutrition, anatomy and physical training. The theoretical subjects concentrate on dance and music history, but students also take more general arts subjects such as aesthetics and philosophy.

At the start of the course each student undergoes a physical examination and has an individual training programme drawn up for him/her in conjunction with the Centre for Elite Sports. The Oslo Sports Trauma Research Centre (NIMI) helps the students to avoid injuries, and physiotherapists are available throughout the course.

.

BA Classical Ballet

Three-year course (180 credits)

The programme is intended for young, talented dancers wanting to train in classical ballet after completing their compulsory primary and secondary education. The programme is also open to applicants who have completed upper-secondary schooling or parts thereof. The aim of the course is to train dancers for established Norwegian and foreign ballet companies.

Dance techniques and on-stage communication make up the main part of the course. Students also create their own works through the study of choreography. There are also classes in musical subjects, nutrition, anatomy and physical training, as well as a number of general academic subjects. These are tailored to the age group and include Norwegian, English and social studies, as well as dance theory.

At the start of the course each student undergoes a physical examination and has an individual training programme drawn up for him/her in conjunction with the Centre for Elite Sports. The Oslo Sports Trauma Research Centre (NIMI) helps the students to avoid injuries, and physiotherapists are available throughout the course.

BA Jazz Dance

Three-year course (180 credits)

The programme is intended to train dancers for the free dance environment, institutional theatres, advertising, reviews, film and TV – and for various initiatives targeted at schools and the business community. A further aim is for students to learn to create their own workplace.

Dance techniques and on-stage communication make up the main part of the course. Students also create their own works through the study of choreography. There are also classes in musical subjects, nutrition, anatomy and physical training. The theoretical subjects concentrate on dance and music history, but students also take more general arts subjects such as aesthetics and philosophy.

At the start of the course each student undergoes a physical examination and has an individual training programme drawn up for him/her in conjunction with the Centre for Elite Sports. The Oslo Sports Trauma Research Centre (NIMI) helps the students to avoid injuries, and physiotherapists are available throughout the course.

MA Choreography

Two-year course (120 credits)

The master’s programme in choreography is intended to train choreographers to be able to work at the highest national and international level on established stages and in the field of free dramatic art.

Creative work involving dance and staging are the students’ main concerns, and all the subjects on the curriculum reinforce this. Production of pieces the students have choreographed themselves and a thesis make up approximately one third of the course. The course also comprises musical and administrative subjects, as well as various arts and social subjects, including philosophy and aesthetics, which form the basis for work on the students’ own artistic development.

The course will enable students to develop an independent artistic style as a choreographer, and carry out choreographic work as part of other artistic productions. Students will become familiar with various choreographic working methods and styles.

Collaboration with other specialist groups within dramatic art provides students with experience of the collective process which creates a production. Knowledge of staging effects is an important element of the course.

Practical educational dance programme

One-year full-time course (60 credits)

The practical educational dance programme (PPU) is funded through the Ministry of Education and Research’s Outline plan for practical educational programmes. Applicants must have completed academic or vocational studies and have professional experience. The programme comprises educational science (30 credits), teaching theory (30 credits) and 12–14 weeks’ practical training.

Instruction takes the form of meetings, with three meetings in each semester. The practical training is organised both as ‘on-the-spot’ practice and as ongoing practical training.

PPU qualifies students to work as a single-subject teacher at intermediate and secondary level in the compulsory school system, and in upper-secondary schools and adult education. The PPU in dance also aims to equip students to teach dance to pre-school children and in the voluntary sector, e.g. in schools of performing arts and private ballet schools, and to work as college teachers. The PPU in dance also provides the necessary skills to rehearse professional dancers in cultural institutions.

External links
Oslo National Academy of the Arts

Ballet schools
Ballet
Ballet
Educational institutions established in 1979
Educational institutions disestablished in 1996
1979 establishments in Norway